Alexander Way (13 August 1925 – 7 November 2014) was an Australian rules footballer who played with Carlton in the Victorian Football League (VFL) during the 1940s.

Way played six games in his debut season, for 12 goals, five of them in a match against Geelong. He was recruited from the Coburg Rangers and was a member of Carlton's 1945 premiership team.

Way, the nephew of former Carlton player Jack Way, later moved to Tasmania where he played for City and later Longford in the Northern Tasmanian Football Association. He then returned to Melbourne in 1963, where he lived in the south-east suburbs until his death in November 2014.

References

External links

Holmesby, Russell and Main, Jim (2007). The Encyclopedia of AFL Footballers. 7th ed. Melbourne: Bas Publishing.
Profile at Blueseum

1925 births
2014 deaths
Australian rules footballers from Melbourne
Carlton Football Club players
Carlton Football Club Premiership players
City-South Football Club players
Longford Football Club players
One-time VFL/AFL Premiership players